Miguel Ângelo Torres Palha (born 26 February 1995 in Guimarães) is a Portuguese footballer who plays for Union Titus Pétange in Luxembourg, as a goalkeeper.

Football career
On 18 March 2015, Palha made his professional debut with Vitória Guimarães B in a 2014–15 Segunda Liga match against Olhanense.

References

External links

Stats and profile at LPFP 

1995 births
Living people
Portuguese footballers
Association football goalkeepers
Liga Portugal 2 players
Vitória S.C. B players
Sportspeople from Guimarães